The Greenwood Witch is an American ultralight aircraft that was designed and produced by Marvin Greenwood. The aircraft was supplied as a kit for amateur construction.

Design and development
It features a strut-braced high-wing, T-tail, a single-seat, open cockpit, tricycle landing gear and a single engine in pusher configuration.

The aircraft is of mixed construction, including bolted-together aluminum tubing, 4130 steel tubing, wood and dope and aircraft fabric. Its  span wing is supported by a single lift strut per side, with jury struts, and incorporates a unique folding mechanism. The wing folds by first hinging the outer panels onto the inner panels and then the whole wing pivots on a central steel post to allow positioning fore-and-aft for towing on its landing gear or for storage.

The Witch accommodates its pilot on an open seat, with a small cockpit fairing with a windshield. The controls are conventional three-axis, with half-span ailerons and an all-flying stabilator. The tricycle landing gear features nose wheel steering and includes a small tail caster. The engine is mounted underneath the center of the wing and drives the pusher propeller though a short extension shaft.

Specifications (Witch)

See also

References

External links
Photo of a Witch

1980s United States ultralight aircraft
Homebuilt aircraft
Single-engined pusher aircraft